Wolli Creek railway station is located at the junction of the Airport and Illawarra lines, serving the Sydney suburb of Wolli Creek. It is served by Sydney Trains T4 Illawarra line, T8 Airport & South line services and NSW TrainLink South Coast line services.

History
Wolli Creek station was built as part of the Airport line opening on 21 May 2000. The name derives from a local creek branching from the Cooks River, and Wolli Junction is the name of the original junction point for the East Hills line from the Illawarra line at this site. In the initial concept for the Airport Line, no station was to be provided at this site, however the State Rail Authority decided to construct a station here as an interchange point with the new Airport line and the Illawarra line.

The station, unlike the others built on the line, was constructed with government finance and hence is owned by the Transport Asset Holding Entity. In the initial concept and design phase, the station was named North Arncliffe, however this was changed to Wolli Creek in 1998. During construction, a set of points allowing the cross-over of trains from the Illawarra local lines to the Illawarra main lines was moved further south.

A secondary motivation was to promote urban renewal around the station site. The station is located on a former industrial site and siding, and the area around the station was occupied by light industrial businesses when the station opened. Since the station's opening, the suburb has been significantly redeveloped with high density housing which as of 2015 is ongoing. As part of this development, the Airport line platforms have been partially covered over.

Platforms & services

Transport links
Transit Systems operate one route from Wolli Creek station:
348: to Prince of Wales Hospital

Trackplan

References

External links

Wolli Creek Station at Transport for New South Wales (Archived 9 April 2020)

Easy Access railway stations in Sydney
Railway stations in Sydney
Railway stations in Australia opened in 2000
Illawarra railway line
Airport Link, Sydney
East Hills railway line
Bayside Council